Harry Smith (1873-1957) was a Scotland international rugby union player

Rugby Union career

Amateur career

Smith played for Watsonians.

Provincial career

He was capped by Edinburgh District in 1898.

International career

He was capped 11 times for the Scotland international side.

Administrative career

He was President of the Scottish Rugby Union for the period 1942 to 1947.

References

1873 births
1957 deaths
Edinburgh District (rugby union) players
Presidents of the Scottish Rugby Union
Rugby union players from North Berwick
Scotland international rugby union players
Scottish rugby union players
Watsonians RFC players
Rugby union forwards